Barholm and Stowe is a civil parish in the South Kesteven district of Lincolnshire, England.  According to the 2001 census it had a population of 87 in 34 households, increasing to a population of 139 in 60 households at the 2011 census.   The parish covers the village of Barholm and the Stowe hamlet.

Local Administration
The parishes of Barholm and Stowe are part of Casewick ward and do not have a Parish Council due to the level of residents therefore the parish has a Meeting. There are Two District Councillors and a County Councillor. The Current District Councillors are Kelham Cooke (Con) and Rosemary Woolley (Con)

References

Civil parishes in Lincolnshire
South Kesteven District